Erik Hajas (born 16 September 1962) is a Swedish handball player who competed in the 1988 Summer Olympics, in the 1992 Summer Olympics, and in the 1996 Summer Olympics.

In 1988 he was a member of the Swedish handball team which finished fifth in the Olympic tournament. He played all six games and scored 21 goals.

Four years later he was part of the Swedish team which won the silver medal. He played six matches and scored 30 goals.

At the 1996 Games he won his second silver medal with the Swedish team. He played six matches and scored 30 goals.

References

External links
profile

1962 births
Living people
Swedish male handball players
Olympic handball players of Sweden
Handball players at the 1988 Summer Olympics
Handball players at the 1992 Summer Olympics
Handball players at the 1996 Summer Olympics
Olympic silver medalists for Sweden
Swedish expatriate sportspeople in Spain
Olympic medalists in handball
Medalists at the 1996 Summer Olympics
Medalists at the 1992 Summer Olympics
Swedish people of Hungarian descent